Steffen is a surname and given name, and may refer to:

Albert Steffen (1884–1963), Swiss poet, painter, and novelist
Alex Steffen (b. 1968), American writer and environmental futurist
Anthony Steffen (1929–2004), Brazilian actor; acted in many spaghetti westerns
Britta Steffen (b. 1983), German Olympic swimmer
Clare E. Steffen (b. 1954), American psychologist
David Steffen, American businessman and politician
Hans Steffen (1865–1937), German geographer and explorer of Patagonia
Jason Steffen (b. 1975), American physicist
Jim Steffen (1936–2015), American football player
Kai Steffen (born 1961), German football player 
Konrad Steffen (1952-2020), Swiss glaciologist and Arctic climate researcher
Otto Steffen (b. 1874, d. unknown), American Olympic gymnast
Renato Steffen (born 1991), Swiss football player
Sonja Steffen (b. 1963), German politician
Thomas L. Steffen (1930–2020), American judge
Waldemar Steffen (b. 1872, d. unknown), German Olympic track and field athlete
Walter Steffen (1886–1937), American professional football player
Willi Steffen (1925–2005), Swiss football player
William L. Steffen (1947–2023), Australian climate science expert and researcher
Zack Steffen (born 1995), American soccer player

See also
Steffen Glacier in the Northern Patagonian Ice Field

Surnames from given names